North Indian cuisine is collectively the cuisine of Northern India, which includes the cuisines of Jammu and Kashmir, Punjab, Haryana, Himachal Pradesh, Rajasthan, Uttarakhand, Delhi, Uttar Pradesh and adjoining western Bihar.

Sub-types of North Indian cuisine include:
Awadhi cuisine
Bhojpuri cuisine
Bihari cuisine
Cuisine of Uttar Pradesh
Cuisine of Haryana
Cuisine of Kashmir
Dogri Cuisine (from Jammu)
Kumaoni cuisine
Mughlai cuisine
Punjabi cuisine
Rajasthani cuisine

North Indian cuisine has strong Central Asian influences introduced during Mughal Empire as compared to its southern or eastern counterparts.

References

External links